Bidens eatonii (Eaton's beggarticks) is a North American species of flowering plant in the family Asteraceae. It is native to eastern Canada (Québec, New Brunswick, Prince Edward Island) and the northeastern United States (Maine, Massachusetts, Connecticut, New York, New Jersey).

Bidens eatonii is an annual herb up to 150 cm (60 inches) tall. It produces as many as 3 flower heads containing yellow disc florets but usually no ray florets (occasionally 1, 2, or 3). The species grows mostly along the banks of estuaries and coastal salt marshes.

Conservation status in the United States
It is listed as endangered in Connecticut, Massachusetts, and New Jersey. It is listed as threatened in Maine.

References

External links
 Maine Department of Agriculture, Conservation and Forestry, Maine Natural Areas Program description, photos, ecological information
 

eatonii
Flora of Eastern Canada
Flora of the Northeastern United States
Plants described in 1903
Salt marsh plants